The Haunted Honeymoon is a 1925 American silent comedy film directed by Fred Guiol and Ted Wilde, starring Glenn Tryon and Blanche Mehaffey with Janet Gaynor in one of her first films. One of the first comedies to parody horror films, it was produced by Hal Roach and released by Pathé Exchange.

Cast

References

External links

Poster at Getty Images

1925 films
1925 comedy films
1925 short films
1920s parody films
American black-and-white films
American silent short films
American comedy short films
Films directed by Ted Wilde
Pathé Exchange films
Silent American comedy films
1920s American films